van Schalkwyk is an Afrikaans surname. Notable people with the surname include:

Jaco van Schalkwyk (born 1979), South African rugby union player
Marthinus van Schalkwyk (born 1959), South African politician
Shadley van Schalkwyk (born 1988), South African cricketer
Theunis van Schalkwyk (1929–2005), South African boxer

Afrikaans-language surnames
Surnames of Dutch origin